The 1st Grand Prix de Caen was a Formula Two motor race held on 27 July 1952 at the Circuit de la Prairie, Caen. The race was run over 75 laps of the circuit, and was won by French driver Maurice Trintignant in a Gordini Type 16. Trintignant's teammate Jean Behra was second and Louis Rosier was third in a Ferrari 500.

Classification

References

Caen Grand Prix
Caen Grand Prix
Caen Grand Prix